The Cité des Sciences et de l'Industrie ("City of Science and Industry", abbreviated la CSI) or simply CSI is the biggest science museum in Europe. Located in the Parc de la Villette in Paris, France, it is one of the three dozen French Cultural Centers of Science, Technology and Industry (CCSTI), promoting science and science culture.

About five million people visit the Cité each year. Attractions include a planetarium, a submarine (the Argonaute), an IMAX theatre (La Géode) and special areas for children and teenagers. The CSI is classified as a public establishment of an industrial and commercial character, an establishment specialising in the fostering of scientific and technical culture. Created on the initiative of President Giscard d'Estaing, the goal of the Cité is to spread scientific and technical knowledge among the public, particularly for youth, and to promote public interest in science, research and industry.

The most notable features of the "bioclimatic facade" facing the park are Les Serres – three greenhouse spaces each 32 metres high, 32 metres wide and 8 metres deep. The facades of Les Serres were the first structural glass walls to be constructed without framing or supporting fins. Between 30 May and 1 June 2008, the museum hosted the 3rd International Salon for Peace Initiatives.

Features

 Explore (levels 1, 2, and 3)
 The library of science and industry (Médiathèque, level −1)
 City of children (level 0)
 Auditorium and things (level 0)
 Louis Lumière theatre (level 0)
 Planetarium (located between exhibits on level 2)
 Numeric crossroads (level −1)
 City of careers (level −1)
 City of health (level −1)
 Meeting place (level −1)
 Aquarium (level −2)
 Jean bertin hall (level 0)
 Condorcet hall (level 0)
 Picnic area (level 0)
 Post office (level 0)
 Store for scientific books and toys (level 0)
 Restaurants (level −2)
Argonaute museum ship

History
The building is constructed around the vast steel trusses of an abattoir sales hall on which construction had halted in 1973. The transformation, commissioned on 15 September 1980, was designed by the architect Adrien Fainsilber and the engineering firm Rice Francis Ritchie (RFR Engineers). It was opened on 13 March 1986, inaugurated by François Mitterrand upon the occasion of the encounter of the Giotto space probe with Halley's Comet.

Floor Directory

Access
It is accessible by Métro Line 7 at the Porte de la Villette station and by bus lines 60, 71, 75, 139, 150, 151, 152 and 170. The tramway T3b was opened in December 2012.

See also
Cité de la musique, City of Music
La Géode, an IMAX domed theatre
List of museums in Paris
Le Zénith, a concert arena in Parc de la Villette
Parc de la Villette

References

External links 

  including light version
48 photos of the Cité

1986 establishments in France
Industry museums
Museums in Paris
National museums of France
Buildings and structures in the 19th arrondissement of Paris
Planetaria in France
Technology museums in France
Science museums in France
Museums established in 1986